Gumdrops are a type of gummy candy. They are brightly colored pectin-based pieces, shaped like a narrow dome (sometimes with a flattened top), often coated in granulated sugar and having fruit and spice flavors; the latter are also known as spice drops.

History

Gumdrops first appeared in the 19th century United States, purportedly as early as 1801, although at that time they likely referred to small, hard sweets also derived from fruit gelatin. The name "gumdrop" is not found in print until 1859, appearing in an advertisement published by the Decatur, IL Illinois State Chronicle for a candy shop owned by a George Julier. By that time, a gelatin-based, rubbery candy akin to modern gummies went by the gumdrop name, but also a pastier candy with a potato starch base.

One of the oldest types of gumdrops still produced are "spice" gumdrops, using traditional spices including clove, anise, allspice, spearmint, cinnamon, and wintergreen for flavoring.

Usage
Gumdrops, spice drops, and their variations are used in baking for decorating cakes. Around Christmas, they are sometimes used to decorate gingerbread houses and other confections.

In popular culture

The Apollo 9 Command module was nicknamed "Gumdrop".

The board game Candy Land includes a "Gumdrop Pass" and "Gumdrop Mountain".

The use of the expression "goody gumdrops" as an alliterative exclamation of joy was first recorded in the 1959 novel Strike Out Where Not Applicable by British crime author Nicolas Freeling: "Buttered toast, and cherry cake, as well as Marmite. Goody, goody gumdrops."

See also

 Chuckles
 Dots
 Gummi bear
 Jelly baby
 Jujube
 Maynards
 Turkish delight
 Wine gum
 Jelly bean
 Mint (candy)

References

External links
 Cooks.com Gumdrop recipes

Gummi candies

es:Pastilla de goma